Joe or Joseph Moran may refer to:

 Joe Moran (footballer) (1880–?), Welsh football player
 Joe Moran (hurler) (born 1987), Irish hurler
 Joe Moran (social historian), social and cultural historian
 Joe Moran, a character in the film Babes in Arms
 Joseph P. Moran (1895–1934), physician to the mob